Chasing Trouble is a 1926 American silent Western film directed by Milburn Morante and starring Pete Morrison, Ione Reed and Tom London.

Cast
 Pete Morrison as Ballard
 Ione Reed as Emily Gregg 
 Tom London as Jerome Garrett 
 Roy Watson as Judge Gregg 
 Frances Friel as Sal Karney 
 Milton J. Fahrney as Sheriff 
 Jewel Bennett as Carnegie McCue 
 J.A. Wiley as Stech 
 Al Richmond as Jim O'Reilly 
 Skeeter Bill Robbins as Munn 
 Lilly Harris as Ma Flaherty 
 Fred Gamble as Bartender

References

External links
 

1926 films
1926 Western (genre) films
1920s English-language films
Universal Pictures films
Films directed by Milburn Morante
American black-and-white films
Silent American Western (genre) films
1920s American films